A constitutional referendum was held in Panama on 15 December 1940. Voters were asked whether the new constitution should be enacted. A reported 98.7% voted in favour.

Results

References

1940 referendums
Referendums in Panama
1940 in Panama
Constitutional referendums
December 1940 events